Melaneremus is a genus of Orthopterans, sometimes known as 'leaf-folding crickets' in the subfamily Gryllacridinae and tribe Gryllacridini.  The recorded distribution (probably incomplete) is: the Indian subcontinent, China, Indochina, western Malesia and western Pacific islands.

Species 
The Orthoptera Species File lists:
 Melaneremus atrotectus (Brunner von Wattenwyl, 1888)type species  (as Eremus atro-tectus Brunner von Wattenwyl)
 Melaneremus bellus Tan & Wahab, 2018
 Melaneremus bilobus Bey-Bienko, 1957
 Melaneremus borneensis (Karny, 1925)
 Melaneremus canillii (Griffini, 1915)
 Melaneremus fruhstorferi (Griffini, 1914)
 Melaneremus fuscoterminatus (Brunner von Wattenwyl, 1888)
 Melaneremus harmandi (Griffini, 1912)
 Melaneremus henryi Karny, 1937
 Melaneremus javanicus (Karny, 1924)
 Melaneremus kempi (Griffini, 1914)
 Melaneremus kosraensis Vickery & Kevan, 1999
 Melaneremus laticeps (Karny, 1926)
 Melaneremus marianae Vickery & Kevan, 1999
 Melaneremus nigrosignatus (Brunner von Wattenwyl, 1893)
 Melaneremus philippinus (Griffini, 1908)
 Melaneremus pupulus (Bolívar, 1900)
 Melaneremus saiensis Vickery & Kevan, 1999
 Melaneremus sikkimensis Ingrisch, 2018

References

External links

Ensifera genera
Gryllacrididae
Orthoptera of Indo-China
Orthoptera of Malesia